Elspeth Thompson (26 June 1961 – 25 March 2010) was a British author and journalist.

Early life and education 
Elspeth Susan Thompson was born on June 26, 1961 at Staplehurst, Kent. She grew up on a farm. The family moved to Bromley, and she was sent to Mary Datchelor Girls' School in Camberwell Grove. She won a place at Trinity College, Cambridge, where she studied History and the History of Art.

Career 
She was the author of many books including A Tale of Two Gardens (2003), The London Gardener (2004) and The Wonderful Weekend Book (2008). She also presented a four-part series on trees for BBC Radio 4, and wrote on gardening and interiors for The Sunday Telegraph, the Observer and the Guardian.

Personal life 
In 1999, Elspeth Thompson married BBC Radio producer Frank Wilson. They have a daughter, Mary.

References
Obituary in Daily Telegraph
Profile in the Guardian

Further reading 
 "Life After Elspeth", Sunday Telegraph, 25 July 2010. Interview with husband Frank Wilson. Accessed 14 February 2023.

1961 births
2010 deaths